Chartered Mathematician (CMath) is a professional qualification in Mathematics awarded to professional practising mathematicians by the Institute of Mathematics and its Applications (IMA) in the United Kingdom.

Chartered Mathematician is the IMA's highest professional qualification; achieving it is done through a rigorous peer-reviewed process. It provides formal recognition of a member’s qualifications in Mathematics, professional practise of Mathematics at an advanced level, technical standing, and commitment to remain at the forefront of Mathematics theory and practise throughout one's professional career.

The required standard for Chartered Mathematician registration is typically an accredited UK MMath degree, at least five years of peer-reviewed professional practise of advanced Mathematics, attainment of a senior-level of technical standing, and an ongoing commitment to Continuing Professional Development.

A Chartered Mathematician is entitled to use the post-nominal letters CMath, in accordance with the Royal Charter granted to the IMA by the Privy Council.  The profession of Chartered Mathematician is a 'regulated profession' under the European professional qualification directives.

See also
 Institute of Mathematics and its Applications

References

External links
Institute of Mathematics and its Applications website

Mathematics education in the United Kingdom
Mathematician
Mathematics